The Canghai Commandery was an administrative division of the Chinese Han dynasty established by the Emperor Wu in 128 BC.

History
The commandery covered an area in northern Korean peninsula to southern Manchuria. Nan Lü (Hanja:南閭), who was a monarch of Dongye and a subject of Wiman Joseon, revolted against Ugeo of Gojoseon and then surrendered to the Han dynasty with 280,000 people. The Canghai Commandery was established following this revolution, however in 2 years, it was abolished by Gongsun Hong.

There is no historical information as to the exact location of the Canghai Commandery, but it is thought to be located in today's South Hamgyong Province or the Gangwon Province beside the Sea of Japan. The establishment of the Canghai Commandery encouraged the Han dynasty’s invasion of the Korean peninsula and it finally led to the establishment of the Four Commanderies of Han and the fall of Wiman Joseon. The Canghai Commandery had close relations with the Xuantu Commandery, which was one of the Four Commanderies of Han.

See also
Four Commanderies of Han
Lelang Commandery
Lintun Commandery
Xuantu Commandery
Zhenfan Commandery
Daifang commandery

Notes

References

Former commanderies of China in Korea
Commanderies of the Han dynasty
Early Korean history
Han dynasty